Politkofsky was a small Russian-built Imperial Russian Navy sidewheel gunboat that patrolled the Alaskan Panhandle in the 1860s.

She had early copper boilers and a crosshead steam engine taken from the Imperial Russian Navy ship Imperator Nikolai I. When Tsar Alexander II of Russia sold Russian Alaska to the United States in 1867, Politkofsky was included in the deal. The gunboat was then sold into civilian service as a tugboat.

As the tug Polly, the ship worked along the northwest coast of North America. During the Klondike Gold Rush of the late 1890s, she operated on the Yukon River, where she sank in 1906.

Maritime incidents in 1906
Ships built in Russia
Tugboats of the United States
Victorian-era gunboats
Naval ships of Russia
1850s ships
Shipwrecks in rivers
Shipwrecks of the Alaska coast